Re: Percussion is the debut album by American jazz percussion ensemble M'Boom recorded in 1973 for the Strata-East label.

Another recording of the same name, with two compositions by Joe Chambers, was released on Baystate.

Reception
The Allmusic review by Scott Yanow awarded the album 4 and a half stars, stating, "The colorful sounds are full of surprises, and the music is both consistently stimulating and quite accessible".

Track listing
 "Morning, Noon, Midday" (Omar Clay, Warren Smith) - 5:44     
 "Attention - Call & Response" (Richard "Pablo" Landrum) - 0:47
 "Jihad Es Mort" (Joe Chambers) - 8:15   
 "Elements of a Storm / Thunder & Wind" (Warren Smith) - 2:00    
 "Inner Passion" (Freddie Waits) - 4:04    
 "Heaven Sent" (Roy Brooks) - 5:08    
 "Onamotapoeia" (Omar Clay) - 6:38
Recorded on August 25, 1973

Personnel
Roy Brooks, Joe Chambers, Omar Clay, Max Roach, Warren Smith, Freddie Waits - drums percussion, vibes, marimba, xylophone
Richard "Pablo" Landrum - conga, bongos

References

Strata-East Records albums
Max Roach albums
M'Boom albums
1973 albums